The 1961 NCAA Tennis Championships were the 16th annual NCAA-sponsored tournaments to determine the national champions of men's singles, doubles, and team collegiate tennis in the United States.

Defending champions UCLA again captured the team championship, the Bruins' seventh such title. UCLA finished just one point ahead of rivals USC in the final team standings (17–16).

Host site
This year's tournaments were contested at the Forker Tennis Courts at the newly-rechristened Iowa State University in Ames, Iowa.

Team scoring
Until 1977, the men's team championship was determined by points awarded based on individual performances in the singles and doubles events.

References

External links
List of NCAA Men's Tennis Champions

NCAA Division I tennis championships
NCAA Division I Tennis Championships
NCAA Division I Tennis Championships
NCAA Tennis Championships
Tennis in Iowa